Karen Erika Donfried is an American foreign policy expert who is currently serving as the Assistant Secretary of State for European and Eurasian Affairs. She previously served as president of the German Marshall Fund from April 2014 to September 2021.

Early life and education
Donfried was born as daughter to Karl P. Donfried and Katherine E. Donfried at Amherst, Massachusetts and spent her early childhood in Heidelberg, Germany. Her father was a professor of religion at Smith College, and her mother was the owner of an automobile parts company.

Donfried obtained her bachelor's degree in government from Wesleyan University. At Wesleyan, she was elected to Phi Beta Kappa. She later obtained her master's degree and PhD from the Fletcher School of Law and Diplomacy at Tufts University, and as well as a magister from the University of Munich. Donfried is fluent in German.

Career
Donfried served for ten years as a European specialist at the Congressional Research Service. She joined the German Marshall Fund in 2001.

From 2003 to 2005, Donfried worked for the U.S. State Department's Policy Planning Staff. In 2005, she returned to the German Marshall Fund to serve as senior director of policy programs and later as executive vice president until 2010.

Afterwards, Donfried worked as the national intelligence officer for Europe on the National Intelligence Council. At NIO, she directed and drafted strategic analysis for senior policymakers.

After NIO, Donfried worked at the National Security Council as a Special Assistant to the President and Senior Director for European Affairs.

In April 2014, Donfried became the first female president of the German Marshall Fund.

Since 2019, Donfried has been co-chairing on the Transatlantic Task Force of the German Marshall Fund and the Bundeskanzler-Helmut-Schmidt-Stiftung (BKHS), alongside Wolfgang Ischinger.

Biden administration
On March 26, 2021, President Joe Biden nominated Donfried as Assistant Secretary of State for European and Eurasian Affairs. The Senate Foreign Relations Committee held hearings on her nomination on July 20, 2021. The committee favorably reported her nomination on August 4, 2021. Donfried was confirmed by the entire Senate on September 28, 2021, by a vote of 73-26.

Other activities
 Council on Foreign Relations, Member
 American Council on Germany (ACG), Member
 Foreign Affairs Policy Board, Member
 Paris School of International Affairs (PSIA), Member of the Strategic Committee
 World Economic Forum (WEF), Member of the Europe Policy Group (since 2017)
 World Economic Forum (WEF), Member of the Global Future Council on the Future of Regional Governance

Awards
Donfried became an officer of the Order of Merit of the Italian Republic in 2018, received the Cross of the Order of Merit from the German government in 2011, became an officer of the Order of the Crown of Belgium in 2010, and received a Superior Honor Award from the U.S. Department of State in 2005 for her contribution to revitalizing the transatlantic partnership.

Personal life
Donfried married in June 1988 to Alan Untereiner, a graduate of Harvard College and Yale Law School. Donfried speaks German.

References

Living people
Ludwig Maximilian University of Munich alumni
Obama administration personnel
Biden administration personnel
Recipients of the Order of Merit of the Federal Republic of Germany
The Fletcher School at Tufts University alumni
United States Assistant Secretaries of State
United States National Security Council staffers
Wesleyan University alumni
Year of birth missing (living people)
Commanders of the Order of the Crown (Belgium)